Beinn Lochain is one of the Arrochar Alps at , in the Argyll Highlands. The mountain is situated to the west of Lochgoilhead. It continues the rugged and wild feel of the local area as it sits next to its higher neighbour Beinn Bheula which reaches a height of over 2,500 feet.

References

Mountains and hills of Argyll and Bute
Grahams
Marilyns of Scotland